The Elk River Formation is a geologic formation in Oregon. It preserves fossils.

See also

 List of fossiliferous stratigraphic units in Oregon
 Paleontology in Oregon

References
 

Geologic formations of Oregon